L (Learning) is a 2011 Greek comedy-drama film directed by Babis Makridis in his debut, and written by Makridis and Efthymis Filippou, based on an original idea by Yorgos Giokas. It stars Aris Servetalis as a 40 year old man whose life rapidly changes over the course of a single day.

Makridis had previously produced a short film, The Last Fakir (2005), which received the Newcomer's Prize at the 2005 International Short Film Festival in Drama. L, his first feature film, was the first Greek selection to compete at the 2012 Sundance Film Festival (19–29 January 2012) where its international premiere took place. It was also nominated to compete in the official Tiger Awards competition in the International Film Festival Rotterdam (25 January – 5 February 2012). The film was nominated for Best Script award at the Hellenic Film Academy Awards. A six-minute extract was first released at the Work Progress Section of the Karlovy Vary International Film Festival, at the Czech Republic in July 2011.

Plot
A Man lives in his car. He is 40 years old and although he does not have a lot of free time, when he does, he chooses to spend it with his family. He meets his wife and two children at a specified day and time in car parking lots. His job is to locate and bring the finest honey to a 50-year-old man. A New Driver shows up and the Man gets fired. The Man's life changes and he finds it absurd that no one trusts him anymore.

Cast
 Aris Servetalis as the Man
 Makis Papadimitriou as the Black Rider
 Yannis Bostantzoglou as the Boss
 Eleftherios Matthaios as The Bear
 Nota Tserniafski as the Wife
 Stavros Raptis as the Friend
 Thanassis Dimou as the New Driver
 Christoforos Skamnakis as the Yachtsman
 Pavlos Makridis as the Son
 Natalia Tserniafski as the Daughter
 Alexis Kanakis as Motorbiker
 Antonis Iliakis as Meteor

Production

Filming
Filming took place during March and April 2011 in outdoor locations in Attica, Greece and additional filming took place at the end of July 2011. Filming was concluded within 27 days.

Technical information
The movie was filmed in 35mm with an Arriflex BL camera, is 87 minutes long, in colour, sound Dolby SRD, language Greek with English subtitles, 1:85:1 format, edited in Avid.

Production credentials
 Directed, by Babis Makridis
 Script, Efthymis Filippou Babis Makridis, based on an original idea by Yorgos Giokas about a man who lives in his car
 Location Manager, Dimitris Chalkiadakis
 Line Producer, Yorgos Papadimitriou
 Sets, Dafni Kalogianni
 Costumes, Dimitris Papathomas
 Sound, Stefanos Efthimiou
 Mixing/Sound Design, Costas Fylaktidis
 Music, Coti K
 Editor, Yannis Chalkiadakis
 Director of Photography, Thimios Bakatakis
 Executive Producer, Peter Carlton, Christos V. Konstantakopoulos
 Production, Beben Films (Amanda Livanou, Babis Makridis)
 Co Production, NOVA, Feelgood Entertainment, Faliro House Productions, Top Cut, Modiano S.A., Dennis Iliadis, Efthymis Filippou, Yannis Chalkiadakis, Thimios Bakatakis, Yorgos Papadimitriou, Dimitris Papathomas, in association with Warp Films and the support of the Greek Film Center.

Release and distribution
The movie was released in Greek movie theaters in February 2012 by Feelgood Entertainment movie distribution company.

Festivals 
Sundance Film Festival 2012 . Official selection world drama competition.
Rotterdam Film Festival 2012 . IFFR's Tiger Awards Competition.
Copenhagen Film Festival 2012. Official competition for New talent grand pix
Indielisboa 2012. Official Competition.
Seattle International Film Festival 2012. New Directors Competition.
Melbourne International Film Festival 2012. Competition Telescope Section.
Mumbai Film Festival 2012. International Competition.
42 Molodist. Kyiv Film Festival 2012. International Competition. WINNER THE GRAND PRIX OF MOLODIST
Arizona Underground Film Festival 2012. International Competition.
Festival International du Film Indépendant de Bordeaux 2012. International Competition.
36o São Paulo International Film Festival. New Directors Competition.
Shadowline Salerno 2012. Official Competition.
Sydney Film Festival 2012. Section Push Me to the Edge
D' A Festival Internacional de cinema d'author de Barcelona 2012.
Istanbul Film festival 2012. At a special section called " What's happening in Greece?"
Karlovy Vary 2012. Section Another View.
Stockholm Film Festival 2012. Section Twilight Zone .
19th Greek Film Festival 2012 (Melbourne).
Eurasia Film Festival 2012. Section Cinema bridge: East
23 Ljubljana Film Festival 2012. Section Panorama
Sevilla Festival de Cine Europeo. 2012. Section: Focus Europa : Greece.
27º Festival international de cine de mar del plata FESTIVAL INTERNACIONAL DE CINE DE MAR DEL PLATA
18ο Vilnius International Film Festival Lithuania Programm Discoveries

Words about L
FILM DE CULTE
FLIX
FLIX GR
CUEDOTCOMFESSIONS
THE LIMERICK REVIEW
QUIET EARTH
ALTERNATIVE CHRONICLE
SUNDANCE FILM FESTIVAL
SBS.COM.AUSTRALIA
HOLLYWOOD REPORTER

External links
 The official movie blog
 
 L official facebook page
 L official site

2012 films
2012 comedy-drama films
Greek comedy-drama films
2010s Greek-language films